West Virginia Route 114 is a north–south state highway located in the Charleston, West Virginia area. The southern terminus of the route is at U.S. Route 60 (Washington Street) east of downtown Charleston. The northern terminus of the route is at Interstate 79 north of Big Chimney.

WV 114 south of US 119 was formerly part of WV 14, as was WV 214.

Route description
WV 114 begins at US 60 (Washington Street) adjacent to the West Virginia Cultural Center and West Virginia State Capitol in Charleston. It proceeds north as a four-lane highway, interchanging with Interstate 64 and Interstate 77 at a three-level junction. WV 114 assumes steep grades with varying curves until the junction with Yeager Airport's access road, where it becomes two lanes to its terminus at Interstate 79 near Big Chimney.

Attractions
 Charleston
 West Virginia Cultural Center
 West Virginia State Capitol

Major intersections

114
Transportation in Kanawha County, West Virginia